The Department of Home, Prohibition and Excise of state of Tamil Nadu is one of the Departments of Government of Tamil Nadu

Departments Sub Sections

Sub - Departments

Additional Work of Departments

Undertakings & Bodies

Present Ministers For Home 
TBA

Former Ministers For Home 
 2016 - 2021 :
 O. Panneerselvam
 2011 - 2016:
 J. Jayalalithaa
 2006 - 2011:
 M. Karunanidhi

Present Ministers For Prohibition and Excise 
 V. Senthil Balaji

Former Ministers For Prohibition and Excise 
 2016 - 2021 :
 P. Thangamani
 2011 - 2016:
 R. Viswanathan

Former Home Secretaries 
 1947 - 2022:
 O. Pulla Reddi, ICS - Home Secretary
 T.N.S. Raghavan, ICS - Home Secretary
 R. A. Gopalaswami, ICS - Home Secretary
 J. M. Lobo Prabhu, ICS - Home Secretary
 E. U. Damodaran, IAS - Home Secretary
 S. K. Chettur, ICS - Home Secretary
 P. P. I. Vaidyanathan, ICS - Home Secretary
 R. F. Isar, ICS - Home Secretary
 J. Sivanandam, IAS - Home Secretary
 A. Venkatesan, IAS - Home Secretary
 H. K. Ghazi, IAS - Home Secretary
 S. P. Ambrose, IAS - Home Secretary
 H. K. Ghazi, IAS - Home Secretary
 K. Subrahmanyam, IAS - Home Secretary
 C. V. R. Panikar, IAS - Home Secretary
 H. M. Singh, IAS - Home Secretary
 K. Chockalingam, IAS - Home Secretary
 T. V. Venkataraman, IAS - Home Secretary
 K. A. Nambiar, IAS - Home Secretary
 R. Nagarajan, IAS - Home Secretary
 K.J.M. Shetty  IAS - Home Secretary
 B. Vijayaraghavan, IAS - Home Secretary
 K. Malaisamy, IAS - Home Secretary
 P. V. Rajaraman, IAS - Home Secretary
 Ashok Joshi, IAS - Home Secretary
 R. Poornalingam, IAS - Home Secretary
 Santha Sheela Nair, IAS - Home Secretary
 Naresh Gupta, IAS - Home Secretary
 Syed Munir Hoda, IAS - Home Secretary
 Sheela Rani Chunkath, IAS - Home Secretary
 Pavan Raina, IAS - Home Secretary
 S. Malathi, IAS - Home Secretary
 K. Gnanadesikan, IAS - Home Secretary
 Sheela Rani Chunkath, IAS - Home Secretary
 Rameshram Mishra, IAS - Home Secretary
 R. Rajagopal, IAS - Home Secretary
 Niranjan Mardi, IAS - Home Secretary
 Apurva Verma, IAS - Home Secretary
 Niranjan Mardi, IAS - Home Secretary
 S. K. Prabhakar, IAS - Home Secretary

See also 
 Government of Tamil Nadu
 Tamil Nadu Government's Departments
 Ministry of Home Affairs (India)
 Ministry of Defence (India)
 Department of Finance (Kerala)

References

External links 
 (Official Website of the Tamil Nadu Home, Prohibition and Excise Department)
 (Official website of Government of Tamil Nadu)

Tamil Nadu state government departments
State taxation in India
1811 establishments in India